The problem of reconstructing a multidimensional signal from its projection is uniquely multidimensional, having no 1-D counterpart. It has applications that range from computer-aided tomography to geophysical signal processing. It is a problem which can be explored from several points of view—as a deconvolution problem, a modeling problem, an estimation problem, or an interpolation problem.

Motivation and applications
The problem of reconstruction form projections has arisen independently in a large number of scientific fields, since it is widely applied in areas such as medical imaging, geophysical tomography, industrial radiography and so on. For example, by using CT scanner, the lesion information of the patients can be presented in 3D on the computer, which offers a new and accurate approach in diagnosis and thus has vital clinical value.

Problem statement and basics
A projection is a linear mapping of an  dimensional signal into an  dimensional one, where . And the objective of reconstruction is to restore the  dimensional signal based on the  dimensional signal. The following case is a 2-D signal projected into 1D signal.
The signal obtained along  axis is defined to be . The relationship between the original coordinate and the rotated coordinate is given by

or inversely,

Then we have

By varying theta, a large number of projections can be obtained.

Therefore, the unknown  can be obtained from its Fourier transform by means of the Fourier transform inversion integral

By taking the inverse Fourier Transform and assuming , we get

Approaches
In practice, there are a wide rarity of methods that are utilized, most of which are reconstruct 3-D information (volume) from 2-D signals (image). Typically used methods are CT, MRI, PET and SPECT. And the filtered back projection based on the principles introduced above are commonly applied.

Computed Tomography (CT) 

In CT, a volume is formed by stacking the axial slices. The software cuts the volume in a different plane (usually orthogonal). Commonly, slice data is generated using an X-ray source that rotates around the object. X-ray sensors are positioned on the opposite side of the circle from the X-ray source.

Magnetic resonance imaging (MRI)

In MRI, energy from an oscillating magnetic field is temporarily applied to the patient at the appropriate resonance frequency. The protons (hydrogen atoms) emit a radio frequency signal which is measured by a receiving coil. The radio signal can be made to encode position information by varying the main magnetic field using gradient coils.

Positron emission tomography (PET)

The system detects pairs of gamma rays emitted indirectly by a positron-emitting radionuclide (tracer), which is introduced into the body on a biologically active molecule. Three-dimensional images of tracer concentration within the body are then constructed by computer analysis. In modern PET-CT scanners, three dimensional imaging is often accomplished with the aid of a CT X-ray scan performed on the patient during the same session, in the same machine.

Single-photon emission computed tomography (SPECT)

SPECT imaging is performed by using a gamma camera to acquire multiple 2-D images (projections) from multiple angles. Multiple projections are used to yield a 3-D data set. This data set may then be manipulated to show thin slices along any chosen axis of the body.  SPECT is similar to PET in its use of radioactive tracer material and detection of gamma rays, while the tracers used in SPECT emit gamma radiation that is measured more directly.

See also
 3D scanner
 filtered back projection
 Algebraic Reconstruction Technique
 3D data acquisition and object reconstruction

References

External links
 http://www.tecn.upf.es/~afrangi/ibi/reconstruction_color_2.pdf
 http://opax.swin.edu.au/~dliley/lectures/het408/backproj.pdf

Image processing
Signal processing